André Boulerice (born May 8, 1946) is a Canadian politician from Quebec and gay rights activist. He was a member of the National Assembly of Quebec for the riding of Sainte-Marie–Saint-Jacques in Montreal.

Born in Joliette, Quebec, he graduated in specialized education from Cégep du Vieux Montréal. He joined the Parti Québécois in 1970 and later worked for the Chambly school board.

He was first elected to the legislature in the 1985 election, representing the electoral district of Saint-Jacques. Boulerice, one of the first openly gay members of the legislature, was reelected in 1989, 1994, 1998 and 2003 in the redistributed electoral district of Sainte-Marie–Saint-Jacques. He was also the deputy government leader, president of the Quebec division of the Assemblée parlementaire de la Francophonie and immigration minister. He helped introduce civil union for same-sex couples. Boulerice resigned in September 2005.

Electoral record (partial)

References

External links
 

1946 births
French Quebecers
Gay politicians
Canadian LGBT people in provincial and territorial legislatures
Living people
Parti Québécois MNAs
People from Joliette
21st-century Canadian politicians
21st-century Canadian LGBT people
Canadian gay men